Charles Harden Mebane (1862–1926) was a North Carolina Republican politician and educator who served as North Carolina Superintendent of Public Instruction, as president of Catawba College, and as superintendent of the Catawba County Schools.

References

North Carolina Superintendents of Public Instruction
North Carolina Republicans
1862 births
1926 deaths